Nisha Katona, MBE (born 23 October 1971) is a British chef and TV presenter. She is the founder of Mowgli Street Food restaurants and the Mowgli Trust charity, a food writer and  television presenter. She was a child protection barrister for 20 years.

Career
Katona worked full-time as a child protection barrister for 20 years on the Northern Circuit. In 2008, the Department of Culture, Media and Sport appointed her a trustee of National Museums Liverpool and in 2009 she was appointed Ambassador for Diversity in Public Appointments by the Cabinet Office. She then switched to teaching about Indian cuisine. She founded Mowgli Street Food restaurants in the UK, and also founded and chairs the Mowgli Trust, which donates over £300,000 to local and world charities every year.

Katona is the author of five cookbooks: Pimp My Rice, The Spice Tree, The Mowgli Street Food: Authentic Indian Street Food,  The 30-Minute Mowgli and Meat Free Mowgli. She regularly appears on television and radio including the BBC, ITV, Channel 4, Channel 5, Food Network and Radio 4's The Kitchen Cabinet.

On 1 January 2022, Katona was appointed chancellor of Liverpool John Moores University. She is the first alumna of the university to become chancellor and replaces Sir Brian Leveson who became emeritus chancellor.

In July 2021, Katona was selected to join the newly formed Hospitality Council, a team of leading industry experts assembled to deliver the government’s Hospitality Strategy. The strategy aims to help hospitality firms to re-open, recover and become more resilient following the COVID pandemic.

Earlier life
Katona grew up in Ormskirk. She studied at Scarisbrick Hall School and then read law at Liverpool John Moores University, where she met her future husband, Zoltán Katona. She qualified as a barrister at the Inns of Court School of Law in 1996, and is a member of Lincoln's Inn.

Katona worked full-time as a barrister in Chavasse Court Chambers in  Liverpool. In 2008, the Department of Culture, Media and Sport appointed her as a trustee of National Museums Liverpool where she sat on the full board, along with audit and marketing. In 2009, the Cabinet Office appointed her Ambassador for Diversity in Public Appointments.

Television
Katona films regularly for the BBC, Channel 4, ITV and The Food Network. Appearances have been on Lorraine, Sunday Brunch, Secret Chef, My Kitchen Rules, My Spice Kitchen and her own Indian food travelogue for the BBC, Recipes that made me.

She regularly appears as a guest chef on This Morning, guest panelist on The Kitchen Cabinet on BBC Radio 4, and on both BBC News and Sky News as a guest expert on matters relating to business and hospitality.

On 14 February 2021, a 10-part culinary travel series presented by Katona called A Taste of Italy was premiered on Channel 4 and More 4.

On 16 March 2021, she was a guest judge in the  semi-final of Interior Design Masters, in which the designers made over a pair of restaurants in Hebden Bridge.

On 13 July 2021, Katona was one of the professional chefs on ITV's Cooking with the Stars. In the six-part series, she trained her celebrity partner, Harry Judd, in preparing dishes which were then judged. In the final episode, Judd was named the winner.

On 10 August 2021, Katona appeared as a guest chef on BBC 1's Masterchef, challenging four celebrities to cook an Indian recipe from her menu.

On 6 September 2021, it was announced that Katona would be one of the members of the new judging panel of Great British Menu joining the former champion Tom Kerridge and the comedian and food podcaster Ed Gamble.

Books 
 Mowgli Street Food: Stories and recipes from the Mowgli Street Food restaurants
 The Spice Tree: Indian Cooking Made Beautifully Simple
 Pimp My Rice: Delicious recipes from across the globe
 The 30-Minute Mowgli: Fast Easy Indian from the Mowgli Home
 Meat Free Mowgli: Simple & Delicious Plant Based Indian Meals

Restaurants

Awards and honours
 British Curry Awards 2022 - Best Restaurant North West
 Best Companies Awards 2022 - The UK’s Top 100 Best Large Companies to work for - Rank #16.
 Best Companies Awards 2021 - The UK’s Top 100 Best Large Companies to work for - Rank #28.
Casual Dining Awards 2020 - The Trailblazer of the Year Award.
Honorary Doctor of Business Administration - Edge Hill University (2019).
Honorary Fellow - Liverpool John Moores University (2019).
MBE - (New Year Honours 2019) Honoured for services to the food industry.
 The LDC Top 50 Most Ambitious Business Leaders, 2019.
The Sunday Times Fast Track 100 2019 - Best Emerging Brand Award.
The Sunday Times Fast Track 100 2019 - Best Management Team Award.
The Sunday Times Fast Track 100 2019 - Rank #45.
The Sunday Times Fast Track 100 2018 - Rank #17.
 Retailers’ Retailer Winner 2018 - Emerging Concept.
 Wireless Social's Woman Entrepreneur of the Year, 2018.
 Business of the Year, City of Liverpool Business Awards - 2018
 Best Medium Sized Business, North West Business Masters Awards - 2018
 Maserati Top 100, People's choice

References

External links 
 
 Mowgli's
 Mowgli Trust

1971 births
Women chefs
British people of Indian descent
British television chefs
People from Ormskirk
Chefs of Indian cuisine
Living people
Members of the Order of the British Empire